KMED (106.3 FM) is a radio station licensed to Eagle Point, Oregon, United States, and serving the Medford-Ashland area. The station is owned by Bicoastal Media.

History
In the later 1990s, the station was branded as "Eagle 106.3" with a rock format. By the early 2000s, the format had evolved to active rock as "106-3 KZZE". On August 3, 2015, at 12:00 pm, KZZE flipped to an adult album alternative format known as "106.3 The Valley" and changed its call letters to KYVL. The first song on "The Valley" was "New Frontier" by Donald Fagen

On January 8, 2023, KYVL changed its format from adult album alternative (which moved to its HD2 subchannel) to sister station KMED's news/talk format, with the sign-off of KMED's 1440 AM frequency. Its current translators began relaying KYVL's HD2 subchannel. On January 11, the stations swapped call signs, with 106.3 assuming KMED.

Translators
KMED broadcasts on the following translators:

References

External links

MED
News and talk radio stations in the United States
Eagle Point, Oregon
1998 establishments in Oregon
Radio stations established in 1998